Club Deportivo Libertad (usually called simply Libertad or Libertad de Sunchales) is a sports club from  Argentina, with homebase in the Sunchales city of Santa Fe Province. The club is better known for both its association football and basketball teams.

Apart from those sports, other disciplines hosted by Libertad are bocce, equestrianism, karate, roller skating, tennis, and volleyball.

Football
The club's football team plays in the Torneo Argentino A, the regionalized 3rd level of Argentine football. Club's most important achievement has been gaining promotion to the Argentino A during the 2006–07 season of the Torneo Argentino B.

Squad of 2011–12

Basketball
The basketball team currently plays at the top division of Argentine league system, the Liga Nacional de Básquet (LNB). The club's home arena is the Hogar de Los Tigres. Libertad won the Argentine league once (2007–08 season), and the South American league twice (2002 and 2007). They also won the Torneo Top 4 of the 2002–03 season.

Kit uniform

Current roster

Honours 
 Torneo Nacional de Ascenso (2): 1997–98, 2017–18

External links
  

Football clubs in Santa Fe Province
Association football clubs established in 1910
Basketball teams in Argentina
Basketball teams established in 1910
1910 establishments in Argentina